Sergipe is the smallest state of the Brazilian Federation.

Sergipe may also refer to:
 Sergipe Province, a former province of the Empire of Brazil
 Sergipe River, a river in Sergipe state
 Club Sportivo Sergipe, a Brazilian association football team